This is a list of submissions to the 84th Academy Awards for Best Foreign Language Film.  The Academy of Motion Picture Arts and Sciences (AMPAS) has invited the film industries of various countries to submit their best film for the Academy Award for Best Foreign Language Film every year since the award was created in 1956. The award is presented annually by the Academy to a feature-length motion picture produced outside the United States that contains primarily non-English dialogue. The Foreign Language Film Award Committee oversees the process and reviews all the submitted films. Nine shortlisted contenders were revealed a week before the announcement of the Oscar nominations.

The deadline for all countries to send in their submissions was 3 October 2011. The submitted motion pictures must be first released theatrically in their respective countries between 1 October 2010 and 30 September 2011.

On 13 October, AMPAS announced that 63 countries had been accepted to participate in the competition for the 2012 Best Foreign Language Film Oscar, including a first-time submission from New Zealand.

On 18 January 2012 the nine shortlisted entries were announced. Six days later, the five nominees were announced. The Iranian entry, A Separation, was announced as the winner at the 84th Academy Awards on 26 February 2012.

Submissions

Notes 
  Albania originally submitted The Forgiveness of Blood, but it was rejected due to protest of Bujar Alimani, the director of Amnesty. He argued that The Forgiveness of Blood shouldn't be eligible to represent Albania due to its American director, Joshua Marston, and key American crew members. AMPAS disqualified it and Albania instead submitted Alimani's film.
  The Dominican Republic's submission was initially rejected because of the country's failure to submit the names of its selection committee members on time, but they appealed and won.
  Luxembourg announced that they had no eligible films, and would not be participating in the competition this year.
  Puerto Rico, which had been invited to participate in the Foreign Oscar race since 1986, tried to submit a film (Sonia Fritz's America) but was rejected, because of a new rule that doesn't allow films from US territories to compete in the Foreign Language Film category. The Puerto Rico Film Commission, which selects the Puerto Rican Oscar nominee, appealed to AMPAS to change its mind, citing its previous Oscar nomination in the category and the presence of non-independent territories like Greenland, Hong Kong and Palestine, but AMPAS refused to change its mind.
  The Slovenian entry Silent Sonata was disqualified because the Society of Slovene filmmakers (Društvo slovenskih filmskih ustvarjalcev, DSFU) neglected to officially submit the entry in time because of a misunderstanding within the organization. Therefore, it wasn't included in the final list of entries.
  Ukraine announced that they had convened an Oscar selection committee, but decided that no Ukrainian film met all the AMPAS requirements, meaning that they did not submit a film for the third year in a row.

References

External links 
 Official website of the Academy Awards

2011 in film
2010 in film
84